Syngrapha montana (Labrador tea looper) is a moth of the family Noctuidae. It is found from coast to coast in most of Canada south in the east to New England and the Great Lakes.

There is one generation per year.

The larvae feed on Ledum groenlandicum.

External links
Species info

Plusiinae
Moths of North America
Taxa named by Alpheus Spring Packard
Moths described in 1869